Eupithecia niveifascia is a moth in the family Geometridae first described by George Duryea Hulst in 1898. It is found in North America from south-western Alberta west to Vancouver Island, north to northern coastal British Columbia and south to New Mexico.

The wingspan is 17–19 mm. The forewings are pale cream with darker yellow-brown and light grey parallel crosslines. The hindwings are white or cream with yellow-brown markings on the lower half and with dark discal bars. Adults have been recorded on wing from the end of May to mid-July.

References

Moths described in 1898
niveifascia
Moths of North America